"Bright College Years" is one of the traditional songs of Yale University, and the university's unofficial but undisputed alma mater. It was written in 1881 by Henry Durand and set to the tune of "Die Wacht am Rhein".

In some old songbooks and publications, the song can be found under the name "Dear Old Yale", possibly a reference to the closing words of another popular Yale song, Neath the Elms: "Jolly, jolly are the days neath the elms of dear old Yale!"

During World War I and shortly afterward, "Bright College Years" was nearly banned for its German origins.  Yale men stationed in Paris sang it to the tune of "La Marseillaise".

Lyrics

Performance 
The Yale Glee Club, custodians of the Yale song tradition through publication of Songs of Yale, traditionally closes every concert with the alma mater. At the end of The Game the Yale Precision Marching Band performs the song while the senior members of the band sing along. Various member parties in the Yale Political Union include "Bright College Years" in their toasting sessions and celebrations. In addition, the song is sung at the end of Class Day (held the day before University Commencement annually). White handkerchiefs are raised in the air and waved on the last line.

Traditionally, only the first and third verses are sung.  The latest publication of Songs of Yale includes the lyrics of the second verse only in the appendix.

In popular culture 
The 1946-49 radio adaptation of Frank Merriwell used "Bright College Years" as its theme tune.
Bright College Years: Inside the American Campus Today is a book by Anne Matthews published in 1997 describing modern day academia.
Bright College Years is a 1971 documentary filmed by Peter Rosen describing the reactions of people at Yale to President Nixon's bombing of Cambodia and the arrest of several Black Panther leaders in New Haven.
"Bright College Days" is the name of a satirical alma mater written by Harvard's Tom Lehrer. It contains several Yale references.

Notes and references

External links 
Traditional Yale Songs lyrics at Yale Glee Club's website

Yale University
American college songs
Alma mater songs
Songs about Connecticut